Icma (possibly from Quechua for widow) is a mountain in the west of the Chila mountain range in the Andes of Peru, about  high. It is located in the Arequipa Region, Castilla Province, Chachas District. Icma lies southwest of Casiri at a lake named Cochapunco.

References

Mountains of Peru
Mountains of Arequipa Region